The 1982–83 Weber State Wildcats men's basketball team represented Weber State College during the 1982–83 NCAA Division I men's basketball season. Members of the Big Sky Conference, the Wildcats were led by eighth-year head coach Neil McCarthy and played their home games on campus at Dee Events Center in Ogden, Utah.

In the opening semifinal in Reno, Montana gave Weber State all they could handle, but fell short by  In the final against host Nevada, the Wildcats won by nine points and advanced to the 52-team NCAA tournament.

Seeded ninth in the West region, Weber State met Washington State in the first round in Boise, and lost by ten points. 

No Wildcats were selected for the all-conference team; senior forward Royal Edwards was on the second team, and honorable mention went to guard John Price, forward Randy Worster, guard Greg Jones, and center Tom Heywood.

Postseason result

|-
!colspan=6 style=| Big Sky tournament

|-
!colspan=6 style=| NCAA tournament

References

External links
Sports Reference – Weber State Wildcats: 1982–83 basketball season

Weber State Wildcats men's basketball seasons
Weber State
Weber State